The 2008 Formula BMW World Final was the fourth and the final Formula BMW World Final race, held for the first time at Autódromo Hermanos Rodríguez in Mexico City on 5–7 December 2008. The race was won by EuroInternational's driver Alexander Rossi, who finished ahead Michael Christensen and Esteban Gutiérrez.

Drivers and teams

Qualifying

Qualifying session

Super Pole Competition

Heats

Heat 1

Heat 2

Heat 3

Point table

Final Race

References

Formula BMW seasons
BMW World Final
BMW World Final